Martin James Kettle (born 7 September 1949) is a British journalist and author. The son of two prominent communist activists, Arnold Kettle (best remembered as a literary critic; 1916–1986) and Margot Kettle (née Gale; 1916–1995), he was educated at Leeds Modern School and Balliol College, Oxford.

Kettle worked for the National Council for Civil Liberties (now known as Liberty) as a research officer from 1973. He then began his career in journalism as home affairs correspondent for New Society (1977–1981) and moved to The Sunday Times in 1981, working as a political correspondent for three years. He has been with The Guardian since 1984 and also wrote regularly for Marxism Today in its later years. He writes a column on classical music in Prospect magazine.

Kettle is best known as a columnist for The Guardian, where he is assistant editor, having worked as the newspaper's Washington D.C. bureau chief from 1997 to 2001. He was formerly a leader writer (1993–1997) and chief leader writer from 2001 onward. He has often defended New Labour and Tony Blair (a personal friend) – though not over the Iraq War. However, soon after the 2010 general election, Kettle wrote that David Cameron's Conservative-led coalition government had had a positive effect on the country. Kettle has been dismissed by John Pilger as Blair's "most devoted promoter".

He has a low opinion of Prime Minister Boris Johnson, writing that "[t]he immediate effect of the judgment [when the Supreme Court declared the prorogation of Parliament invalid] is devastating for Johnson. It is expressed so cogently and unambiguously that it will be difficult for him to wriggle out of it – even though he is certainly foolish enough to try."

In March 2021, Kettle claimed that the Chancellor Rishi Sunak "wants to deploy the financial heft of the Treasury to reinstate the UK in the heart of Scotland's economic and political conversation."

Bibliography 
 Hain, Peter; Kettle, Martin et al., Policing the Police, 1979, John Calder, . Rev. ed. 1980: 
 Kettle, Martin & Hodges, Lucy, Uprising!: Police, the People and the Riots in Britain's Cities, 1982, Macmillan, 
 Kettle, Martin (ed.), Guardian Guide to Europe, 1993, Fourth Estate, 
 Kettle, Martin, The Single Currency: Should Britain Join?, 1997, Vintage,

References

External links 
 Guardian columns by Martin Kettle

1949 births
British male journalists
Living people
The Guardian journalists
Alumni of Balliol College, Oxford
People educated at Leeds Modern School